Kat&Jared are an American Christian music husband-and-wife duo from Belton, Texas, and they started making music together in 2017. They released an extended play, Kat&Jared (2017), with Natives Music Group.

Background
Kat & Jared have built strong musical and personal bonds thanks in part to 8 years spent on the road with Jared’s platinum-selling band Flyleaf. That opportunity to minister through music stoked their faith to become even stronger. As Flyleaf went on hiatus, Kat & Jared knew it was time to take their next step, both as worship leaders and as artists.

Driving rhythms and jubilant melody lines intertwine with Kat’s luminous vocals to create uplifting anthems that celebrate life, love, and devotion.

While the professionalism is undeniable and talent present in spades, what really resonates about Kat & Jared is their warmth. There is a light that shines, a genuine craving to spread heart and hope that emanates from every guitar lick and lyric. This is music that moves both the people who make and those who are lucky enough to hear it. It’s proof, as ever, that we’re stronger together, united in the presence of Jesus Christ.

Kat&Jared are from Belton, Texas, where they are husband-and-wife music duo, while they spent time honing their contemporary worship music at Bethel Church in Temple, Texas.

Music history
The first release, an extended play, Kat&Jared, was released on February 4, 2017, from Natives Music Group.

Members
Past members
 Jared Hartmann (born October 27, 1985, Austin, Texas)
 Kat Hartmann (born September 30, 1985, Killeen, Texas)

Discography
EPs
Kat&Jared (February 4, 2017, Natives)

References

External links

American musical duos
Musical groups established in 2017
Musical groups from Texas
2017 establishments in Texas